Okie is a term meaning resident of Oklahoma.

Okie may also refer to:

 Okie dialect, Southern American English
 Okie dokie, slang for okay
 In James Blish's space story series Cities in Flight, an Okie is a city equipped for space flight, or one of its inhabitants

Music 
 Okie Adams, Carl Frederick Adams, expert banjo maker
 Okie (J. J. Cale album), 1974
 Okie (Vince Gill album), 2019
 Okie from Muskogee, a 1969 album of Merle Haggard
 "Okie from Muskogee" (song), a single from the album written by Roy Edward Burris and Merle Haggard

People 

 Eyabi Okie (born 1999), American football player

See also 
 
 Oakie (disambiguation)
 Okey, a game
 Okey dokey (disambiguation)